Oh Mummy is a video game for the Amstrad CPC models of home computer. It was developed by Gem Software and published by Amsoft in 1984. It was often included in the free bundles of software that came with the computer. The gameplay is similar to that of the 1981 arcade game Amidar.

Gameplay
The object of the game is to unveil all of the treasure within each level (or pyramid) of the game whilst avoiding the mummies. Each level consists of a two-dimensional board. In contrast with Pac-Man, when the player's character walks around, footprints are left behind. By surrounding an area of the maze with footprints, its content is revealed, which is either a scroll, a mummy, a key, a tomb or nothing at all. In order to complete a level, it is necessary to unveil the key and a tombstone. The scroll enables the player to kill/eat one mummy on the level. If a mummy is unveiled, it follows the player to the next level. The difficulty and speed of the game increases as the player progresses through the levels.

The game is primarily for one player but has a limited multiplayer mode in which players can alternate taking a turn to play each level. Whilst, even at the time, it was considered simple in terms of gameplay, graphics and sound, it was for many people one of the better and more addictive early offerings for the Amstrad.

The music played during gameplay is based on the children's song "The Streets of Cairo, or the Poor Little Country Maid".

Ports
The game was also released for the MSX, ZX Spectrum, the Amstrad CPC 464 and Tatung Einstein. The ZX Spectrum version was given away in one of several introductory software packs for the computer, this particular pack also including Crazy Golf, Alien Destroyer, Punchy, Treasure Island and Disco Dan.  The game was also unofficially ported to the Sega Genesis and Mattel Intelevision.

External links
 

1984 video games
Amsoft games
Amstrad CPC games
IOS games
Maze games
MSX games
Single-player video games
Tatung Einstein games
Video game clones
Video games based on Egyptian mythology
Video games developed in the United Kingdom
Video games set in Egypt
ZX Spectrum games
Gem Software games